This is a complete list of school districts in the State of New Mexico.

Bernalillo County

Albuquerque Public Schools
 Moriarty Municipal Schools
 Rio Rancho Public Schools

Catron County

Quemado Independent Schools 
Reserve Independent Schools

Chaves County

Dexter Consolidated Schools 
Hagerman Municipal Schools 
Lake Arthur Municipal Schools 
Roswell Independent Schools

Cibola County

Grants-Cibola County Schools 
Quemado Independent Schools
Zuni Public School District

Due to an agreement between Cibola County and McKinley County, residents of the Ramah Navajo Indian Reservation are bussed to schools in Ramah in McKinley County (including Ramah Middle/High School), of Gallup-McKinley County Schools, even though the students are physically in Cibola County. This is due to the long distance of the nearest Cibola County schools away from the reservation.

Colfax County

 Cimarron Public Schools
 Des Moines Municipal Schools
 Maxwell Municipal Schools
 Raton Public Schools
 Springer Municipal Schools

Curry County

Clovis Municipal Schools 
Grady Municipal Schools 
Melrose Public Schools 
Texico Municipal Schools

Doña Ana County

Gadsden Independent Schools 
Hatch Valley Public Schools 
Las Cruces Public Schools

Eddy County

Artesia Public Schools 
Carlsbad Municipal Schools 
Loving Municipal Schools

Grant County

Cobre Consolidated Schools 
Silver Consolidated Schools

Guadalupe County

Santa Rosa Consolidated Schools 
Vaughn Municipal Schools

Harding County

Mosquero Municipal Schools 
Roy Municipal Schools

Hidalgo County

Animas Public Schools 
Lordsburg Municipal Schools

Lea County

Eunice Public Schools
Hobbs Municipal Schools 
Jal Public Schools 
Lovington Public Schools 
Tatum Municipal Schools

Lincoln County

Capitan Municipal Schools 
Carrizozo Municipal Schools 
Corona Public Schools 
Hondo Valley Public Schools 
Ruidoso Municipal Schools

McKinley County

Gallup-McKinley County Schools 
Zuni Public Schools

Mora County

Mora Independent Schools 
Wagon Mound Public Schools

Otero County

Alamogordo Public Schools 
Cloudcroft Municipal Schools 
Gadsden Independent Schools
Tularosa Municipal Schools

Quay County

 Grady Municipal Schools
 House Municipal Schools
 Logan Municipal Schools
 Melrose Public Schools
 San Jon Municipal Schools
 Tucumcari Public Schools

Rio Arriba County

Chama Valley Schools 
Dulce Independent Schools 
Espanola Public Schools 
Jemez Mountain Public Schools 
Mesa Vista Consolidated Schools

Roosevelt County

 Dora Consolidated Schools
 Elida Municipal Schools
 Floyd Municipal Schools
 House Municipal Schools
 Melrose Public Schools
 Portales Municipal Schools
 Texico Municipal Schools

Sandoval County

Albuquerque Public Schools
Bernalillo Public Schools 
Cuba Independent Schools 
Jemez Valley Public Schools 
 Los Alamos Public Schools
Rio Rancho Public Schools

San Juan County

Aztec Municipal Schools 
Bloomfield Schools 
Central Consolidated Schools 
Farmington Municipal Schools

San Miguel County

Las Vegas City Public Schools 
 Pecos Independent Schools
 Santa Rosa Consolidated Schools
West Las Vegas Public Schools

Santa Fe County

Española Public Schools
Moriarty Municipal Schools
Pojoaque Valley Public Schools 
Santa Fe Public Schools

Socorro County

 Belen Consolidated Schools
 Carrizozo Municipal Schools
 Corona Municipal Schools
 Magdalena Municipal Schools
 Mountainair Public Schools
 Socorro Consolidated Schools

Taos County

 Mesa Vista Consolidated Schools
Peñasco Independent Schools 
Questa Independent Schools
Taos Municipal Schools

Torrance County

Corona Municipal Schools 
Estancia Municipal Schools 
Moriarty Municipal Schools 
Mountainair Public Schools 
Vaughn Municipal Schools

Union County

Clayton Municipal Schools 
Des Moines Municipal Schools

Valencia County

Belen Consolidated Schools 
Los Lunas Public Schools

Single-District Counties

Deming Public Schools (Luna County)
Fort Sumner Municipal Schools (De Baca County)
Los Alamos Public Schools (Los Alamos County, also covers a part of Sandoval County)
Truth or Consequences Municipal Schools (Sierra County)

References

External links
Map of school districts in New Mexico
New Mexico Schools Locator on New Mexico Public Education Department web site

School districts
New Mexico
School districts